Stripped is the fifth studio album by the Danish hard rock/heavy metal band Pretty Maids, released on 6 September 1993 by Columbia Records. In 1992, Pretty Maids released an extended play with acoustic versions entitled Offside for the Japanese market. Due to the success of Offside, the band decided to record a full-length acoustic album with a mixture of new songs and cover songs. "Savage Heart" had previously been released on Jump the Gun (1990), and "Please Don't Leave Me", "In the Minds of the Young", "39" and "Heartbeat from Heaven" were released on Offside. The single "Please Don't Leave Me" reached number 10 on the Danish Singles Chart in 1993.

Track listing
All songs written by Ronnie Atkins and Ken Hammer except where noted.
 "If It Ain't Gonna Change" – 3:34
 "Please Don't Leave Me" (Phil Lynott, John Sykes) – 3:20 
 "In the Minds of the Young" – 4:12
 "Too Late, Loo Loud" – 3:31  
 "Say the Word" – 4:43  
 "39" (Brian May) 3:17
 "Heartbeat from Heaven" – 3:49  
 "How Does It Feel" – 4:22
 "I'll Be There" – 3:02 
 "Savage Heart" – 4:12

Personnel
Pretty Maids
Ronnie Atkins – vocals, arrangement
Ken Hammer – electric guitar, acoustic guitar, backing vocals, arrangement
Kenn Jackson – bass guitar, backing vocals
Michael Fast – drums, percussion, backing vocals

Additional musicians
Dominic Gale – keyboards
Henrik Nilsson – producer, mixing, engineer, additional keyboards
Knud Linhard – engineer, backing vocals
Morten Henningsen – engineer
Allan Krohn – engineer

References

1993 albums
Pretty Maids albums
Columbia Records albums